Lorne Ward (born 16 February 1977 in South Africa) is a former rugby union prop who played for London Welsh, Harlequins, Bath & Toulon.

After retiring from professional rugby he played for Rosslyn Park before hanging up his boots completely at the end of the 2013/14 season.

External links
Bath Rugby profile

1977 births
Living people
Bath Rugby players
Alumni of Maritzburg College
Rugby union props